Konstantinos Giataganas or Konstantinos Yataganas (12 October 1920 – February 1997) was a Greek shot putter and discus thrower who competed in the 1948 Summer Olympics and in the 1952 Summer Olympics.  and won the gold medal in Shot Put at the 1951 Mediterranean Games. and two bronze medals in Discus first  at the 1951 Mediterranean Games  and second  at the 1955 Mediterranean Games.

References

1920 births
1997 deaths
Greek male discus throwers
Greek male shot putters
Olympic athletes of Greece
Athletes (track and field) at the 1948 Summer Olympics
Athletes (track and field) at the 1952 Summer Olympics
Athletes from Athens
Mediterranean Games gold medalists for Greece
Mediterranean Games bronze medalists for Greece
Athletes (track and field) at the 1951 Mediterranean Games
Athletes (track and field) at the 1955 Mediterranean Games
Mediterranean Games medalists in athletics
20th-century Greek people